"Whatever You Want" is a rock song by the British rock band Status Quo. Written by Rick Parfitt and Andy Bown, it was released on the album of the same name in 1979 and has become one of the band's better-known works. The track peaked at number 4 on the UK charts on 30 September 1979. It originally appeared on the band's 1979 album Whatever You Want and was later re-recorded for their 2003 album Riffs.

Composition
The song commences with a quiet introduction, containing a guitar playing notes from chords. Rick Parfitt and Francis Rossi used chorus, fuzz and flanging effects on their guitars. This lasts for approximately 26 seconds, and fades out towards the end. After this, the guitar picks up once more with a D-minor riff, and 40 seconds into the piece, the familiar D-major riff of the song begins, accompanied by drums from the 56 second mark.

At 1 minute, 11 seconds, all audio pauses for approximately half a second; at this point, the lyrical portion commences. The music returns as soon as the first lyrics are heard. This pause creates a short-lived dramatic start to the song, which lasts for a total of four minutes.

Impact
Within the United Kingdom, the song reached number 4 in the UK Singles Chart in 1979. The song has been used in advertising campaigns by popular UK retailer Argos and Ireland based The Gift Voucher Shop which sells the One4all gift vouchers and gift cards, as well as being the theme tune to an ill-fated Saturday night TV show of the same name as the song. It was also parodied in a 1990s advertisement for the now defunct retailer What Everyone Wants, singing the store's name in place of the original song title. In 2008, the song was sampled on the hardstyle song "1980" by Citizen, and then later that same year by German techno band Scooter on the song "Jump That Rock (Whatever You Want)!" from the hit album Jumping All Over The World. The song has also featured albeit in a modified form for the Australian Supermarket chain Coles. The South African trio Mark Haze (from Idols South Africa season seven), Dozi and Ghapi recorded a version on their album "Rocking Buddies" in 2013.

In 2010 a segment of the song was played during a Doctor Who Confidential programme called Amy's Choice where Matt Smith was pointing at Arthur Darvill ponytail in reference to Status Quo lead singer Francis Rossi.

In 2013 the band themselves appeared in an Australian television advertisement for Vegemite at the  Coles Supermarkets chain, with the song as the backing track, as part of the store's "Down Down" campaign.

The song was reprised, in 2014, for the band's thirty-first studio album Aquostic (Stripped Bare). It was featured in the ninety-minute launch performance of the album at London's Roundhouse on 22 October, the concert being recorded and broadcast live by BBC Radio 2 as part of their In Concert series.

The Finnish Liiga club HIFK uses the song as opening song during their home matches, where fans of HIFK clap to the song's tempo when the song starts playing. The German Bundesliga club FC Schalke 04 also used the song as opening song during their home matches until 2015. Dutch Eredivisie club SBV Vitesse has used the song as their opening song for many years.

The song was used as Bill Bailey's buzzer for a 2021 episode of QI titled 'Random'.

Arrangement 
The song is guitar-oriented, like most Status Quo songs. During recording up to three guitar 'layers' were used, though it can be played with two: rhythm guitar and solo guitar. The other instruments are a bass guitar, keyboards and drums. The lyrics are multi-vocal; for instance the 'Whatever you want' part is sung entirely with two voices.

The guitar low 'E' string is tuned to a D (the song is in the key of D). This is required to play the intro and also the low strumming after the intro. In this later part a flanger effect is used together with the ever-present overdrive/distortion effect.

Charts

Certifications

References

External links

1979 songs
Status Quo (band) songs
Songs written by Rick Parfitt
Songs written by Andy Bown
Song recordings produced by Pip Williams